Flubendiamide is a synthetic petrochemical pesticide in of the ryanoid class which acts at receptors in insect muscles. The chemical contains a perfluorinated functional group.

Regulation
The United States Environmental Protection Agency registered it conditionally in 2008 for use on over 200 crops, including almonds and alfalfa, with some crops having as many as six applications per year. The EPA requested Bayer CropScience and Nichino America to submit a voluntary cancellation, which they rejected. The EPA then announced its intent to cancel its conditional approval of flubendiamide in March 2016. The registration was cancelled later in 2016.

The product is available in other jurisdictions such as Europe and India.

References

Insecticides
Benzamides
Iodoarenes
Organofluorides
Sulfones